Until Forever is a 2016 American independent biographical romantic drama film written and directed by Michael Linn and starring Stephen Anthony Bailey and Madison Lawlor. It is based on the life of Michael Boyum (1976-1999), a 22-year-old man from Inver Grove Heights, Minnesota who married his high school sweetheart, Michelle Larson, six weeks before he died of leukemia.

Plot

Cast
Stephen Anthony Bailey as Michael Boyum
Madison Lawlor as Michelle Larson
Jamie Anderson as Matthew Boyum
James Stephens III as Mr. Fenton
Melina Alves as Diana
Susan Chambers as Bonnie Boyum
Jess Coreau as Shirley Larson
Dennis Linn as Dan Boyum
Robert Kampa as Denny Larson

Production
Filming took place in Hot Springs, South Dakota. The film was also shot in the Twin Cities. A scene was also filmed at the Meridian Highway Bridge.

Reception
Edwin L. Carpenter of The Dove Foundation gave the film a positive review and wrote that it "features strong acting — especially that of Stephen Anthony Bailey as Michael and Madison Lawlor as Michelle — a tightly written script, and wonderful music."

References

External links
 
 
 
 

2016 biographical drama films
2016 independent films
2016 romantic drama films
American biographical drama films
American independent films
American romantic drama films
Films set in the 20th century
Films shot in Minnesota
Films shot in South Dakota
2010s English-language films
2010s American films